Perfluoroisobutene (PFIB) is the perfluorocarbon counterpart of the hydrocarbon isobutene and has the formula (CF3)2C=CF2. An alkene, it is a colorless gas that is notable as a highly toxic perfluoroalkene. Few simple alkenes are as toxic.

Safety
Perfluoroisobutene is highly toxic with an LCt = 880 mg⋅min⋅m−3 (mice).  It is a Schedule 2 substance of the Chemical Weapons Convention.

Perfluoroisobutene is highly reactive toward nucleophiles.  It hydrolyzes readily to give the relatively innocuous (CF3)2CHCO2H, which readily decarboxylates to give hexafluoropropane.  It forms addition compounds with thiols, and it is this reactivity that may be related to its toxicity.

PFIB is a product of pyrolysis of polytetrafluoroethylene (PTFE), one of the substances invoked to explain polymer fume fever.

See also
Phosgene
Bis(trifluoromethyl) disulfide

References

External links
 International Chemical Safety Card 1216

Fluorocarbons
Haloalkenes
Pulmonary agents
Trifluoromethyl compounds